The Canton of Aix-en-Provence-I or Aix-en-Provence-Centre is a former canton located within the commune of Aix-en-Provence in the Bouches-du-Rhône department of France. It had 41,361 inhabitants (2012). It was created 27 February 2003 by the decree 2003-156 of that date. It was disbanded following the French canton reorganisation which came into effect in March 2015. 

Elected to represent the canton in the General Council of Bouches-du-Rhône'' :
 Bruno Genzana (UMP, 2001-2008)

Area
It is composed of the part of Aix-en-Provence along the centre of a line defined by the axis of the following roads: avenue Eugène-de-Mazenod, avenue Joseph-Rigaud, avenue Georges-Brassens, route des Alpes, ruisseau La Torse, avenue Jean-et-Marcel-Fontenaille, avenue Sainte-Victoire, cours Saint-Louis, boulevard Carnot, cours Gambetta, rue Paul-Beltçaguy, avenue Saint-Jérôme, chemin Robert, boulevard du Roi-René, avenue Benjamin-Abram, voie de chemin de fer, avenue des Belges, avenue de l'Europe, avenue du Petit-Barthélemy, avenue de la Figuière, avenue du Club-Hippique, chemin des Piboules, chemin des Aubépines, chemin des Flâneurs, avenue de l'Europe, route de Valcros, route de Galice, voie de chemin de fer, avenue Jean-Dalmas, cours des Minimes, avenue De Lattre-de-Tassigny, avenue Henri-Pontier, avenue Paul-Cézanne, chemin des Lauves.

Neighbourhoods
Centre-ville: Mazarin, Villeneuve, Tanneurs, Ville comtale et Bourg Saint-Sauveur, Ville de Tours
Sextius-Mirabeau
Montperrin
Encagnane
Val de l'Arc
Pont de Béraud
Tour d'Aygosi
Val Saint-André
Corsy
Beisson
Saint-Eutrope

See also
 Arrondissement of Aix-en-Provence
 Cantons of the Bouches-du-Rhône department
 Communes of the Bouches-du-Rhône department

References

Aix-en-Provence-I
Aix-en-Provence
2015 disestablishments in France
States and territories disestablished in 2015
2003 establishments in France